Chesterville is an unincorporated community in Sparta Township, Dearborn County, Indiana.

History
A post office was established at Chesterville in 1884, and remained in operation until it was discontinued in 1907.

Geography

References

External links

Unincorporated communities in Dearborn County, Indiana
Unincorporated communities in Indiana